Farah Naaz Hashmi, commonly credited as Farah, is a leading Bollywood actress of the mid 1980s and early 1990s. She is the elder sister of Tabu.

Farah made her debut in Faasle in 1985 under the Yash Chopra films banner. She was one of the prominent actresses in Bollywood in the late eighties and early nineties. She was paired with Prosenjit Chatterjee in 1989 Bengali movie Aamar Tumi. Farha's landmark films were Naseeb Apna Apna (1986), Imaandaar (1987), Woh Phir Aayegi, Naqab (1989), Yateem (1988), Baap Numbri Beta Dus Numbri (1990), Begunaah (1991), Bhai Ho To Aisa (1995) and Sautela Bhai (1996). She is today remembered for her three films with Rajesh Khanna.

She retired from acting in 1996 after her first marriage, though she later did a few television serials. She worked with almost all of the top actors of her time, including Rajesh Khanna, Rishi Kapoor, Sanjay Dutt, Sunny Deol, Anil Kapoor, Jackie Shroff, Aamir Khan, Mithun Chakraborty, Govinda and Aditya Pancholi.

Early life and background
Farah was born to Jamal Ali Hashmi and Rizwana in a Hyderabadi Muslim family. Her parents divorced soon after. Her mother was a school-teacher and her maternal grandparents were retired professors who ran a school. Her grandfather, Mohammed Ahsan, was a professor of Mathematics, and her grandmother was a professor of English Literature.

She is the niece of Shabana Azmi, Tanvi Azmi and Baba Azmi and the elder sister of Tabu.

Career
Farah made her debut in 1985 with Yash Chopra's Faasle opposite Mahendra Kapoor's son Rohan Kapoor Although Faasle was a disaster, Farah got many other big offers such as Shakti Samanta's Palay Khan, K.C. Bokadia's Naseeb Apna Apna and Pran Lal Mehta's Love 86.

She was part of hits such as Marte Dam Tak, Naseeb Apna Apna, Love 86, Imaandaar, Ghar Ghar Ki Kahani, Diljalaa, Rakhwala, Woh Phir Aayegi, Veeru Dada, Baap Numbri Beta Dus Numbri and Begunaah

J.P. Dutta's Yateem got her critical acclaim, and it was one of her performance-oriented roles, along with films such as Hamara Khandaan, Kaarnama, Naqaab, Khatarnaak and Pati Patni Aur Tawaif, although they were commercial failures. Her performance in the hit films – Woh Phir Aayegi and Begunaah were critically acclaimed.

In the 1990s, she worked with Aamir Khan in two films; Jawani Zindabad and Isi Ka Naam Zindagi, but both flopped at the box office. She was signed for Khuda Gawah and she shot for a few scenes, but due to delays in production, she was later replaced with Shilpa Shirodkar. However, till date, her role in Woh Phir Aayegi and Begunaah
with Rajesh Khanna are considered her best performances. By the same time, she married Dara Singh's son Vindu Dara Singh.

Farah then started playing supporting roles in films such as Muqabla, Dhartiputra and Izzat Ki Roti. Muqabla was very successful, but later, her other films between 1993 and 1996 were not successful, though Sautela Bhai was a commercial hit and critically acclaimed.

She later switched to television and did serials such as Amar Prem, Andaz, Ahaa (all three produced by Himesh Reshammiya), Vailayiti Babu , Angan , Ardhangini , Aurat Teri Yehi Kahani and Papa. Farah was also planning a mega serial called Taqdeer, but she shelved the project. She then acted in 2004 in Hulchul.

Personal life
Farah married actor Vindu Dara Singh in 1996, with whom she has a son Fateh Randhawa (b.1997). The couple divorced in 2002. She later remarried fellow Bollywood and television actor Sumeet Saigal in 2003.

Filmography

References

External links
 

Living people
Indian film actresses
Actresses in Hindi cinema
Place of birth missing (living people)
Actresses from Hyderabad, India
Actresses in Malayalam cinema
20th-century Indian actresses
Actresses in Telugu cinema
Actresses in Punjabi cinema
Actresses in Bengali cinema
Year of birth missing (living people)